Khush Roi Kalan is a village in Srigufwara tehsil in Anantnag district in the Indian occupied state of Jammu and Kashmir.

Demographics
As of 2011 India census, Khush Roi Kalan had a population of 2547 in 410 households. Males constitute 50.9% of the population and females 49%. Kalan has an average literacy rate of 46.28%, lower than the national average of 74%, male literacy is 63.27%, and female literacy is 36.71%. In Khush Roi Kalan, 19.9% of the population is under 6 years of age.BRZAMAAN

References

Villages in Anantnag district